Monochrome (stylized in all caps) is the fifth studio album by South Korean singer-songwriter Lee Hyori. It was released on May 21, 2013, by B2M Entertainment and distributed by CJ E&M Music. The album, which has an analogue sound and retro feel, departs from her previous style of music. It is her first full-length release after a three-year hiatus since H-Logic (2010).

Unlike her previous work, Lee collaborated with foreign composers such as Norwegian songwriting team Dsign Music, who previously composed Girls' Generation's "Tell Me Your Wish (Genie)" and "I Got a Boy". She also worked with blues musician Kim Tae-chun, and her then-boyfriend Lee Sang-soon for the new record. Beenzino, a member of hip-hop duo Jazzyfact, Bak Ji-yong from vocal trio Honey G, comedian Ahn Young-mi, and Lee's companion dog Soonshim participated on the album as featured artists.

Monochrome contains a total of sixteen tracks, including the lead single "Bad Girls", the self-composed hit "Miss Korea", and "Show Show Show", a cover of "No No No" originally performed by German pop trio Monrose. A special edition of the album, featuring a 156-page photo book and limited to 5,000 copies, was available for pre-order starting on May 9, 2013.

The album sold about 17,000 physical copies and 2.75 million digital tracks in 2013, making it the 79th best-selling Korean album of that year. Lee bounced back as a musician thanks to the album's success, winning the award for Best Female Artist at 2013 Mnet Asian Music Awards.

Background
Lee's comeback was pushed back multiple times throughout 2012, until it was finally announced that she would return to the stage with her fifth studio album in May 2013. While recording, many rumors floated around on what the album would sound like. Lee rejected the rumors when she tweeted and urged people to "not to be deceived by any of fake information about the album", on February 7, 2013. Two days later, she posted on her official fan club, asking fans to "not to be bored even if there would be more than 10 tracks in her new album". Lee stated that she felt the "greed" to create an album with weighty quality.

Unlike her previous work, it was reported that she collaborated with foreign composers for the new record. According to an official from B2M Entertainment, Lee's agency, Monochrome will contain a number of acoustic and easy listening songs instead of her previous style of electronic pop music. However, the official also stated that the singer has made an effort to reach the nexus between her and the listeners by choosing a dance tune with a powerful group choreography as the title track of her album.

Release
On May 9, it was announced that the singer's fifth full-length album would be titled Monochrome, and its album cover was unveiled. Beginning on the same day, a normal edition and a special limited edition of the album were available for pre-order. Limited to 5,000 copies, the latter features a 156-page photo book, and was all sold out.

Monochrome was released both digitally and physically on May 21, 2013. The album peaked at number four on the Gaon Albums Chart.

Teasers
Vogue Korea announced that Lee would introduce her new song through "Show Girl", a fashion music video of her recent photo shoot with the magazine on April 19, 2013. With the concept of a circus show girl, she donned several sexy outfits in the middle of nowhere, surrounded by abandoned circus sets and props. "Show Girl" was sequentially released on the first of May via Vogue Korea'''s iPad app, the magazine's website, and then its YouTube channel. According to Lee's agency, the background music for the video was titled "Show Show Show", which is a cover of Monrose's "No No No".

Lee Hyori uploaded a photo via her official Twitter on April 22, 2013, with the sentence "I used to be the sweetest girl ever... 'til I found out being the baddest girl was better" superimposed onto it. Five video teasers were released for the album through B2M Entertainment's YouTube channel at noon the following day. Under the theme of "What Are You Doing, Hyori?", the series of teasers featured footage from Lee's daily life, and recording sessions and photo shoots for Monochrome, with the sound of brass instruments played as background music.

Singles

"Miss Korea"
A music video teaser for "Miss Korea", a pre-release single from the album, was unveiled on May 2, 2013. The video directed by South Korean music video director Cha Eun-taek, and the single itself was released four days later. The self-composed song contains the message of comfort and hope, comparing all women to Miss Korea, as the end of the song follows, "Are others' eyes that important? / Does it feel like it's your fault when something goes bad? / No, it's not like that, come here / It'll be okay, you're a Miss Korea". The lyrics was later donated to the Hangang Bridge, as part of "the Bridge of Life" project promoted by Samsung Life Insurance.

Upon its release, "Miss Korea" debuted at number one on both the Gaon Singles and Download Charts. It peaked at number three on the Billboard Korea K-Pop Hot 100 for the week of May 25, 2013.

Lee personally selected 30 non-celebrity women "with love and respect for themselves" who she saw as the genuine "Miss Korea"s, to perform the song together on stage at the 2013 SBS Gayo Daejeon televised concert.

Jessica Jung, former member of girl group Girls' Generation, covered this song at the concert SM Town Week Girls' Generation – Märchen Fantasy.

"Bad Girls"
The album's lead single "Bad Girls" is a dance tune only consisted of acoustic band sound. Lee's self-written lyrics depicts the reality, in which confident women are considered "bad".

CJ E&M Music, the distributor of the album, released a video teaser for the track on May 15, 2013. As a parody of SBS's current affair program The Its Know, the teaser stimulates curiosity through narrations such as "Why did Lee Hyori become a bad girl?" and "From now on, we're going to unleash the truth about her". Lee spoofs Sharon Stone's interrogation scene from the 1992 film Basic Instinct. According to the singer's agency, two versions of the music video, a story-centered one and a choreography-centered one, would be released. The former features cameo appearances from designer Yoni P, Gil of Leessang, model Jang Yoon-ju, SPICA member Ju-hyun, and actress Kim Seul-gi. The latter was released on May 23, 2013.

"Bad Girls" went straight to number one on both the Gaon Singles and Download Charts in the first week of June 2013, as the album's pre-release single did. It also topped the Billboard Korea K-Pop Hot 100 for the week of June 8, 2013, becoming her first song to reach the chart's pole position, a week after debuting at number 25. This song won the first place on televised K-pop music shows like SBS's The Music Trend, KBS's Music Bank, MBC Music's Show Champion, and Mnet's M! Countdown, from June 2 to 13.

Lee performed "Bad Girls" as part of a highly praised collaboration stage at the 2013 SBS Gayo Daejeon televised concert, along with CL from girl group 2NE1, who had also released a bad girl themed song that year called "The Baddest Female".

Promotion
Lee held a special comeback show titled 2HYORI SHOW at the Ilsan KINTEX on May 14, 2013, performing her brand-new songs including "Bad Girls", "Full Moon", "Wouldn't Ask You", and "Bounced Checks of Love". The show was recorded in private, and aired through the cable channel Mnet on May 22, 2013, at 6:00 pm and 11:00 pm KST. The show was also broadcast on OnStyle, KMTV, tvN, O'live TV, and StoryOn at 6:00 pm the same day, simultaneously.

Lee began promoting her comeback album on various music programs, starting on the May 24, 2013, broadcast of KBS's Music Bank. Along with the lead single, she promoted "Miss Korea" on Music Bank and MBC Music's Show Champion, "Holly Jolly Bus" on MBC's Music Core and Mnet's M! Countdown, and "Full Moon" on SBS's The Music Trend for her comeback stages, respectively. She performed "Full Moon" also on MBC's Dancing with the Stars.

On KBS's You Hee-yeol's Sketchbook, Lee performed the two lead singles and "Show Show Show", along with her previous hits "10 Minutes", "Chitty Chitty Bang Bang", and "U-Go-Girl". The singer wrapped up promotions for Monochrome, performing a rock-arranged version of the title track, with featured artists Ahn Young-mi and Kim Seul-gi, at 2013 Mnet 20's Choice Awards.

Awards and nominations

Track listing

Notes
 "Wouldn't Ask You" was originally composed by blues musician Kim Tae-chun, although never officially released. The song was later given as a gift to Lee Hyori, with some foul words at the end of the lyrics, "I wouldn't ask you why you left me / I wouldn't curse at you and call you a b**** / I wouldn't curse at you and call you a c*** / I wouldn't ask you why you left me", excluded.
 The lyrics of "Oars" includes "Ieodosana", an old sea shanty which the haenyeos in Jeju Island sing when they go out to work.

Credits and personnel
Credits for Monochrome'' adapted from album liner notes.

 Lee Hyori – vocals, songwriter, music producer
 Soonshim the Dog – featured artist
 Mads Louis Hauge – songwriter
 Phil Thornalley – songwriter
 Jang Seok-beom – harmonica
 Kim Bo-a – background vocals
 Lee Sang-soon – arrangement, guitar
 Min Jae-hyeon – bass
 Bak Yong-jun – keyboard
 Shin Seok-cheol – drums
 Beenzino – featured artist
 Brian Kim – songwriter
 Christian Vinten – songwriter
 Gabriella Jangfeldt – songwriter
 Peter Lars Kristian Wennerberg – songwriter
 Jeong Jin-wook – keyboard
 Nermin Harambasic – songwriter
 Robin Jenssen – songwriter
 Ronny Vidar Svendsen – songwriter
 Anne Judith Wik – songwriter
 Chris Young – songwriter
 Min Dong-sook – songwriter
 Kim Tae-chun – songwriter, arrangement, guitar
 Oh Jae-young – bass
 Lee Won-seok – drums
 Kim Min-gyu – recording engineer
 Lee Seung-yun – songwriter, arrangement
 Lee Sang-tae – bass
 Jo Yong-chan – drums, tambourine
 Lee Seong-hwan – recording engineer
 Ahn Tae-bong – recording engineer

 Kim Mi-jin – songwriter
 Kyosti Anton Salokorpi – songwriter
 Bak Ji-yong – featured artist, piano
 Eirik Johansen – songwriter
 Thomas Henriksen – songwriter
 Hayley Aitken – songwriter
 Jo Dong-hee – songwriter
 Jaakko Salovaara – songwriter
 Matti Mikkola – songwriter
 Joanna Wang – songwriter
 Ahn Young-mi – featured artist
 Raph Schillebeeckx – songwriter
 Sanne Putseys – songwriter
 Mats Valentin-Berntoft – songwriter
 Hayley Penne – songwriter
 Lee Kyu-ho – songwriter
 Kim Ji-woong – co-producer
 Bae Young-jun – music editing, arrangement
 Heo Eun-sook – music editing, recording engineer
 Choi Ja-yeon – music editing
 Lee Geun-seop – director of production and management
 Jeon Hyeong-jin – director of production and management
 Joo Cha-woong – artist management, promotion
 Jeong Cheon-young – artist management, promotion
 Son Seung-woo – artist management, promotion
 Bak Mi-ran – public relation, publicity
 Kim So-young – planning, development
 Shin Ji-seon – planning, development
 Kim Gyu-sang – choreography director
 Kim Yong-deok – choreography director
 Kim Jin-cheol – choreography director

 Go Min-ae – vocal director, background vocals
 Jo Jun-seong – mixing engineer
 Jeon Hoon – mastering engineer
 Da-young Jenna Lee – mastering coordinator
 Choi Da-hae – publishing, copyright clearance
 Bak So-young – publishing, copyright clearance
 Jeong Hyo-won – publishing, copyright clearance
 Hwang Eun-kyeong – publishing, copyright clearance
 Kim Rae-hyeong – publishing, copyright clearance
 Cha Eun-taek – music video director
 Jeong Bo-yoon – style director
 Jeong Seol – stylist
 Lee Ji-hye – stylist
 Bak Bo-ra – assistant stylist
 Choi Won-kyeong – assistant stylist
 Han Ji-seon – hair stylist
 Jo Mi-yeon – assistant hair stylist
 Hong Seong-hee – makeup
 Hong Jang-hyeon – design director, photographer
 Ryu Kyeong-yoon – assistant photographer
 Choi Jun-ho – assistant photographer
 Kim Min-seon – prop stylist
 Jang Won-seok – digital retoucher
 Ock Min-a – digital retoucher
 Go Joo-yeon – artwork, design
 Jeong Gyu-cheol – printing
 Kang Min-ho – printing
 Gil Jong-hwa – executive producer
 B2M Entertainment – executive producer

Charts

Weekly charts

Monthly charts

Year-end charts

Release history

See also
 List of Korea K-Pop Hot 100 number-one singles
 List of number-one hits of 2013 (South Korea)

Footnotes

References

External links
 
 
 
 
 
 
 

2013 albums
Stone Music Entertainment albums
Korean-language albums
Lee Hyori albums